1,2-Dichloroethyl acetate is a chemical compound used in the making of other organic chemicals. It is a liquid which is either white or resembles water.

References

Organochlorides
Acetate esters